Lieutenant General Roberto Nordio is an Italian Air Force officer, currently serving as Deputy Chief of the General Staff.

Nordio served as commander of the NATO Deployable Air Command and Control Centre from 2013 to 2015 before being appointed deputy commander of the Italian Joint Operations Headquarters.

Nordio was appointed Deputy Chief of the Defence General Staff on 30 March 2016.

References

1958 births
Italian Air Force generals
Living people